Dolphin Mall is a  outlet shopping mall in Sweetwater, Miami-Dade County, Florida, west of the city of Miami. There are over 240 retail outlets and name-brand discounters as anchors.

The mall opened in March 2001, the first of four Taubman Centers malls to open that year. (The others are: The Shops at Willow Bend north of Dallas, Texas, International Plaza and Bay Street in Tampa, and The Mall at Wellington Green in Wellington in Palm Beach County.)

The mall is built like the "Mills" outlet malls owned by Simon Property Group, which include South Florida's largest outlet mall and Dolphin's main competitor, Sawgrass Mills, and similar to Taubman's other outlet mall, Great Lakes Crossing. However, the mall is divided into three districts: Playa (Beach), Ramblas (Boulevards), and Moda (Fashion), and has nine zones.

With  of retail selling space, it is the second-largest mall in Miami-Dade County. Being near Florida International University, it is a popular hang-out place for students.

Once Taubman Centers owned property rights in 2000, the center was downsized to its current , no roller coaster, and a 19-screen Cobb Theaters in the second level in the "Ramblas" Zone.

Anchors and majors
Bass Pro Shops Outdoor World
Bloomingdale's The Outlet Store
Burlington Coat Factory
Cobb Dolphin 19 Cinema
Forever 21
H&M
Marshalls/HomeGoods
Neiman Marcus Last Call
Saks Fifth Avenue OFF 5TH
Old Navy
Ross Dress for Less
Sam Ash Music
Dave & Buster's
The Cheesecake Factory
Texas de Brazil
Victoria's Secret

Expansion

Taubman Centers announced an expansion and renovation of Dolphin Mall that brought five new restaurants, additional and improved valet parking, as well as 900 new parking spaces. The two-phase project began in mid-2014 and was completed in Fall 2015. 
 
Phase 1 was completed in November 2014 which added 360 new parking spaces on the east side of the property by Forever 21 and Marshall's HomeGoods. It also improved access and efficiency to the existing valet parking to the east side of the Ramblas Plaza that is adjacent to the mall's main entry. Additionally, LED lighting upgrades were made to the Ramblas Plaza.
 
Phase 2 began in January 2015. This project included a three level supported parking deck near the old Sports Authority which added 857 new parking spaces, the addition of a second valet area, the renovation of Ramblas Plaza, including new furniture, planters, ornamental shading, LED lighting and more. In addition, a 32,000 square foot restaurant expansion brought five new restaurant including BRIO Tuscan Grille, Burger & Beer Joint, Cabo Flats Cantina & Tequila Bar, and Kona Grill.

References

External links
Dolphin Mall Official Website

Shopping malls in Miami-Dade County, Florida
Outlet malls in the United States
Tourist attractions in Miami-Dade County, Florida
Shopping malls established in 2001
Taubman Centers